Lieutenant-General Émile-Joseph Galet (1870 – 1940) was a Belgian army officer who served as personal military advisor to King Albert I in World War I and later 1926 to 1932.

Biography 
Émile Joseph Galet was born in Erpion in Hainaut Province on 17 December 1870. He was the son of a clog maker. He enlisted as an artilleryman in the Belgian Army at the age of 18 and was rapidly promoted to a sous-officier and gained a place at the École militaire. He was commissioned as an officer in 1894 and his expertise on technical artillery use marked him out among his contemporaries. As a junior officer, he was attached to King Albert I in manoeuvres in 1906, 1908 and 1909 and later taught at the École de Guerre. His views on the importance of artillery in defensive warfare clashed with the dominant preference for the offensive in contemporary military thinking.

Although still only a captain-commandant, he enjoyed the personal confidence of Albert I and served as his unofficial military advisor during the period of fighting on the Yser Front in World War I.

In the aftermath of the war, he was appointed as head of the Royal Military Academy in Brussels. He  replaced Henry Maglinse as Chief of the General Staff on 22 January 1926. He retired from service on 26 December 1932. In 1931, a book titled S.M. le Roi Albert was published under Galet's name, with a preface written by the King. In this memoir about the king, he also defended the tactical decisions he argued on behalf of during World War I.

Galet was recalled from retirement at the time of the German invasion of Belgium in May 1940 and served, briefly, as head of the Belgian Military Mission at France's Grand Quartier Général. He died in Brussels shortly afterwards on 26 November 1940.

References

Works cited

1870 births
1940 deaths
Belgian military personnel of World War I
Academic staff of the Royal Military Academy (Belgium)
People from Hainaut (province)
Belgian generals